Eilers Peak is a prominent peak, about  high, located  north-northwest of Rand Peak in the central Nebraska Peaks. It was named by the Advisory Committee on Antarctic Names after D.H. Eilers of the Ross Ice Shelf Management Office, University of Nebraska, Lincoln, and a member of the United States Antarctic Research Program glaciological party during the Ross Ice Shelf Project, 1974–75 field season.

References 

Mountains of Oates Land